The Common Cause was a weekly publication that supported the National Union of Women's Suffrage Societies first published on 15 April 1909 mainly financed by Margaret Ashton. Its last issue was published on Friday, 30 January 1920, in which it announced its successor The Woman's Leader.

History 
In 1908, the Manchester councillor Margaret Ashton sold her house in Didsbury to fund the creation of a newspaper, which was eventually founded in an office in Manchester in 1912. The intention was that it would represent the policies of and publish news from the NUWSS, but for legal reasons it could not be an organ of the NUWSS . Instead The Common Cause Publishing Co. Ltd was founded with an initial capital of £2,000 to publish the new paper.

Its first editor was Helena Swanwick,  who chose the name "Common Cause" because she believed that humanity was "bi-sexual", in other words that there were not "women's causes" or "men's causes".

She resigned in June 1912 because of the policy of the NUWSS not to criticise the WSPU, the main suffragette organization, because she felt its militancy was hindering the progress of women's suffrage and regarding them as "the greatest danger we have". She wrote to C. P. Scott on 19 July 1912, saying
"I have much sympathy for feminine rebellion. For their claptrap and dishonesty, for their persecution and terrorism, I have loathing."

From 1912 to 1913, Clementina Black was editor. In April 1913, Maude Royden, who had been a regular contributor to the paper, took up the post of editor which she held until 1914. Its last editor was Ray Strachey, who became editor after the end of the First World War.

References 

Defunct weekly newspapers
Defunct newspapers published in the United Kingdom
Newspapers established in 1912